Slatina is the capital city of Olt County, Romania, on the river Olt. It is located in the south of Romania, on the eastern side of the river Olt, in the historical region of Muntenia. The population was 70,293 in 2011; the urban area has around 85,000 inhabitants. It is an important industrial center.

The city administers one village, Cireașov.

History

The town of Slatina was first mentioned on January 20, 1368 in an official document issued by Vladislav I Vlaicu, Prince of Wallachia. The document stated that merchants from the Transylvanian city of Brașov would not pay customs when passing through Slatina. The word Slatina is of Slavic origin, and means "marsh, swamp, watery plain".

Economy
Alro Slatina, the largest aluminum producing factories in Southeastern Europe, is located in the city. Other companies based in Slatina include ALPROM (which, like ALRO, is a subsidiary of VIMETCOGROUP), Altur (engine set manufacturer), Pirelli Tires Romania (tire-manufacturer), Steel Cord Romania (steel cord for tires), TMK Artrom (seamless steel tubes), Prysmian (electronic and electric wires and cables) and Benteler.

One of the oldest private businesses in Romania is the Slatina-based pastry shop Atletul Albanez ("The Albanian Athlete").

Sport

There is an association football club in Slatina, CSM Slatina, that plays in Liga II (the second league of Romania).

The women's handball section of CSM Slatina also represent the city in the top handball league of Romania.

Natives
 Petre S. Aurelian - politician
 Aurelia Brădeanu - handball player
 Ionel Dănciulescu - football player
 Felicia Filip - operatic soprano
 Iulian Filipescu - football player
 Mădălina Diana Ghenea - actress and model
 Eugène Ionesco - playwright
 Claudiu Niculescu - football player
 Monica Niculescu - tennis player

References

External links

 Livecam Slatina, Olt --- Strada Crișan (Libertății - Primăverii)

 
Cities in Romania
Capitals of Romanian counties
Populated places in Olt County
Localities in Muntenia
Place names of Slavic origin in Romania